Shirish Hiralal Chaudhari is an Indian politician popularly known as shirishdada, who is a member of the 15th Maharashtra Legislative Assembly. He is an independent candidate, winning by a margin of 21,239 against the Modi wave.  

Chaudhari represents the Amalner Assembly Constituency. He was the first MLA to establish free gymnasium centers in Amalner district.

References

Maharashtra MLAs 2014–2019
People from Jalgaon district
Independent politicians in India
Living people
Marathi politicians
Year of birth missing (living people)
Bharatiya Janata Party politicians from Maharashtra